Robert Taylor Walker (born August 20, 1914, date of death unknown) was an American baseball pitcher in the Negro leagues. He played with the Harrisburg Stars in 1943 and the Homestead Grays from 1945 to 1949.

Walker was the winning pitcher in the last Negro World Series game ever played. He won his Game 5 matchup for the Grays with a 10-6 decision that was played on October 5, 1948; he pitched the first nine innings before being relieved for Wilmer Fields in the tenth inning, where the Grays scored four runs off Bill Greason to clinch the team's third World Series title in five years. Walker played with the team for the following year.

References

External links
 and Seamheads
R. T. Walker biography from Society for American Baseball Research (SABR)

1914 births
Year of death missing
Homestead Grays players
Harrisburg Stars players
Baseball players from Florida
Baseball pitchers